Farako may refer to:

Farako, Ségou
Farako, Sikasso